Thaligaividuthi is a village in the Orathanadu taluk of Thanjavur district, Tamil Nadu, India.

Demographics 

As per the 2001 census, Thaligaividuthi had a total population of 2125 with 1030 males and 1095 females. The sex ratio was 1063. The literacy rate was 59.41.

References 

 

Villages in Thanjavur district